A saw is a cutting tool.

Saw or SAW may also refer to:

Places
 Saw Kill (disambiguation), three streams in the U.S. state of New York
 Saw Township, a township in Myanmar (Burma)
 Saw, Burma, a town in the above township

People
 "Saw Lady", stage name of Natalia Paruz
 U Saw (1900–1948), Burmese Prime Minister
 Samael Aun Weor

Arts, entertainment, and media

Films and associated media
 Saw (franchise), a horror franchise
 Saw (2004 film), an American independent horror film directed by James Wan
 Saw (soundtrack), a soundtrack album from the 2004 film
 Saw (video game), a 2009 video game based on the film series
 Saw: Rebirth, a one-shot comic published by IDW
 Saw – The Ride, a roller coaster, based on the movie series, at Thorpe Park, England

Music

Instruments and devices
 Saw, a Thai family of musical instruments, including:
 Saw duang
 Saw sam sai
 Saw u
 Musical saw, a regular cutting saw used to produce musical sounds

Groups and labels
 Saw Recordings, a record label
 Stock Aitken Waterman, a British music producing trio

Albums
 Selected Ambient Works 85–92, 1992 debut album by Richard D. James under the pseudonym Aphex Twin
 Selected Ambient Works Volume II, 1994

Science, technology, and mathematics
 SAWStudio (Software Audio Workshop), a digital audio workstation
 Self-avoiding walk, a mathematical sequence
 Submerged arc welding
 Surface acoustic wave
 SAW filter, a type of electronic filter

Weapons
 Squad automatic weapon, or section automatic weapon, light machine gun
 M249 light machine gun, formerly M249 SAW

Transportation
 SAW, IATA airport code for Sabiha Gökçen International Airport
 SAW, MTR station code for San Wai stop
 SAW, National Rail station code for Sawbridgeworth railway station
 Cham Wings Airlines, a Syrian airline (ICAO designator SAW)

Other uses
 Saw (saying), an old proverb or maxim
 Peace be upon him (Islam),  (SAW), an honorific suffix for Muhammad
 Second Automobile Works, of China

See also

Sau (disambiguation)
SAWS (disambiguation)
Sawtooth (disambiguation)
See (disambiguation)
Seeing (disambiguation)